is a Japanese footballer currently playing as a forward for Oita Trinita.

Career statistics

Club
.

Notes

References

External links

1998 births
Living people
Sportspeople from Fukuoka (city)
Association football people from Fukuoka Prefecture
National Institute of Fitness and Sports in Kanoya alumni
Japanese footballers
Association football forwards
J1 League players
Sagan Tosu players
Oita Trinita players